Chris Elder is a retired diplomat of New Zealand.
Until 1973 Chris Elder was trained as a Chinese linguist.
From 1973 to 1975 he was employed in the New Zealand Embassy in Beijing when it was  opened.
From 1993 to 1997 he was ambassador in Beijing.
From 2001 to 2006 he was New Zealand's longest-serving ambassador in Jakarta.
From 2006 to  he was ambassador in the Embassy of New Zealand in Moscow (Russian Federation).
In Wellington, Chris has served as the Deputy Secretary with responsibility for Asian affairs and security policy in the Asia-Pacific region. 
From  to 2012 he was Chargé d'affaires in Berlin.
Despite his expertise in China/New Zealand relations, Chris did not serve again in Beijing.
In 2012 he retired from the Ministry of Foreign Affairs and Trade (New Zealand).
He has published a range of papers and articles relating to New Zealand's interaction with China and with Asia.
With Michael Green, he co-authored a historical survey of New Zealand-China relations (New Zealand and China 1792-1972) and with Robert Ayson a Centre for Strategic Studies Discussion Paper, China's Rise and New Zealand's Interests: A Policy Primer for 2030.

Publications 
Old Peking: City of the Ruler of the World, Oxford University Press, 1997
China's Treaty Ports: Half Love and Half Hate, Oxford University Press, 1999
New Zealand's China Experience: Its Genesis, Triumphs, and Occasional Moments of less than Complete Success, Victoria University Press, 2012
Forty Years On: New Zealand-China Relations then, now and in the Years to Come, Victoria University Press, 2013

References

1947 births
Living people
Ambassadors of New Zealand to China
Ambassadors of New Zealand to Indonesia
Ambassadors of New Zealand to Russia
Ambassadors of New Zealand to Ukraine